Meteorological & Geoastrophysical Abstracts is a scholarly bibliographic database that covers meteorology, climatology, atmospheric chemistry and physics, astrophysics, hydrology, glaciology, physical oceanography and environmental sciences.

Production and Access 

The database is produced by the American Meteorological Society, and is published by DIALOG and Cambridge Scientific Abstracts.

Coverage 

The database has over 508,379 records as of November 2009, and covers literature published 1974–present.  Every month approximately 850 new records are added.  In a 2002 analysis of the database, it was revealed that MGA indexed 72 unique titles, eight of which were peer reviewed.

References 

Atmospheric sciences journals
Bibliographic databases and indexes
American Meteorological Society